During the 2014–15 football season, Sheffield Wednesday F.C. competed in three professional football competitions. Sheffield Wednesday competed in the 2014–15 Football League Championship (finishing 13th), 2014–15 FA Cup, and the 2014–15 Football League Cup. It was the Owls' third consecutive season in the Football League Championship, having secured promotion from League One in the 2011–12 season, securing Championship safety on the last day of the 2012–13 season and securing a 16th-place finish last season. The Football League season kicked off at the beginning of August, along with the League Cup in the same month. Meanwhile, with Sheffield Wednesday being within the top two tiers of the English football league system, the club did not enter the FA Cup until the beginning of January 2015, where they entered at Round 3 of the competition.

Overview

Pre-season
Before pre-season began in July 2014, the first players that were to leave the club were announced. The following players were released from the club just three-days after Sheffield Wednesday's last fixture of their 2013–14 campaign: two goalkeepers Adam Davies and Arron Jameson; defenders Anthony Gardner, Martin Taylor and one of the fan favourites Miguel Llera; midfielder David Prutton and the longest serving player at the club with over 250-appearances Jermaine Johnson. Probably the biggest shock though, even though the player was injury-prone, one of the fan-favourites Réda Johnson, whom was also released. Meanwhile, keeper Chris Kirkland, midfielder José Semedo, and defenders Glenn Loovens and Oguchi Onyewu were offered new contracts at the club.

Sheffield Wednesday's first pre-season fixture was announced on 10 May, the club confirmed that they would be playing Newcastle United at Hillsborough on 30 July. A few days after that, Sheffield Wednesday announced two more pre-season fixtures. They would be playing their South Yorkshire rival Barnsley away at Oakwell on 2 August and playing against Bury away at Gigg Lane on 18 July. On 16 May, Sheffield Wednesday announced their fourth pre-season fixture playing another South Yorkshire rival against Doncaster Rovers at the Keepmoat Stadium on 27 July. Three days later, they announced their first fixture in the pre-season against York City on 12 July. Sheffield Wednesday announced they would be playing against FK Čukarički during their tour of Slovenia on 23 July. However, FK Čukarički later pulled out of the friendly fixture and was replaced with FC Arsenal Tula on 3 July.

On 10 June, massive news was announced at Sheffield Wednesday Football Club. Rumours of the club's ownership being taken-over by Azerbaijani businessman Hafiz Mammadov was confirmed. This saw the ownership of the club pass from Chairman Milan Mandarić, who had owned the club since 2010, in which he saved the club from administration, cleared the club from the majority of its debts, invested into the team to gain promotion to the Football League Championship in the 2011–12 season and has since stabilised the club in the Championship. Milan Mandarić can be classed as a legend at the club, due to saving the Owls from potential extinction and climbing the English football league ladder. Milan Mandarić had this to say: "I am delighted to have concluded a deal with Hafiz, he is a true football man and I have no doubt whatsoever that I am handing over control to someone with a real passion for the game and the ability to carry on the work I started three years ago to return Sheffield Wednesday back to the top division of English football. It's something that the wonderful supporters of this Club deserve having remained so loyal throughout the difficult times prior to my arrival. On my first day at the Club I promised the supporters two things; firstly I would ensure that when I left we would be in far better shape than when I arrived and more importantly, that I would only hand over ownership when I found the right man for the Club and I sincerely believe I have delivered on both undertakings". Meanwhile, Hafiz Mammadov is a successful businessman whom owns Baghlan Group (a company that specialises in oil, gas, construction and transportation), and also owns Azerbaijan football club Baku FC and French team RC Lens, along with having shares in La Liga champions Atlético Madrid and F.C. Porto. Mammadov is known to have a quieter, more private approach with his work and is thought to have bought the club for around €50 million. Hafiz Mammadov had this to say: "I am a passionate football fan with enormous respect for English football. I have been looking at investing in England for some time but I was determined to find the right Club. I am hugely ambitious and feel the Owls match my passion and desire for success and represent our motto of Azerbaijan Land of Fire. I promise the supporters I will work extremely hard to bring the success everyone so rightly craves." On 9 July, rumours occurred across the internet that Sheffield Wednesday owner to be, Hafiz Mammadov, had been arrested by police in his home country of Azerbaijan. Mammadov is still yet to have clarified and confirmed the takeover with the Football League and has still yet to make payments to the French football league on behalf of his other ownership of RC Lens. Lens have had their promotion to Ligue 1 suspended because of this. However, just after 5pm that day and Hafiz Mammadov released a statement saying: "Certain unfounded rumours have been spread in the press over my supposed arrest and imprisonment in Azerbaijan, which I obviously strongly deny, and which was immediately denied by State Border Guards. It seems today that false and malicious speculation over my situation is being used with the aim to create confusion and doubt over my financial holdings and commitments. There are no grounds for the allegations made by the press, and I will take all necessary legal actions against whoever has initiated these false rumours with the aim to harm my family and me". This statement would have been of grate relief to the fans of Sheffield Wednesday.

A week later on 17 June, and the 2014–15 Football League Cup draw was made, and the Owls were drawn at home against the oldest club in the football league - Notts County. The game is to be played in the week commencing 11 August 2014. A day after at 9am the 2014–15 Football League Championship fixtures were announced, with the Owls facing Brighton & Hove Albion away on the first day of the season on 9 August. This is then followed up by home games against Derby County and Millwall. Wednesday face Blackpool at home on Boxing Day and Watford away on the last day of the season, which ends 2 May 2015. The first derby fixture is against Leeds United on 4 October, and the team play Rotherham United for the first time of the season on 8 November at home.

On 3 June Sheffield Wednesday announced the first signings for the club, Matt Young from Southampton and Ed Sanders from Stoke City. Both young defender's signed on one-year deals and will feature in the Development Squad. Just under a week later and Ryan Croasdale signed from Preston North End, also on a one-year contract and will feature in the Development Squad. On 24 June, Sheffield Wednesday made their fourth Development Squad signing in Paul McElroy from Hull City on a one-year contract. However, on 19 July McElroy decided to cancel his one-year contract at Sheffield Wednesday due to some personal terms. The first signing for the first-team squad was announced on 7 July, with Ireland international goalkeeper Keiren Westwood signing on a 2-year deal after being released from Sunderland. One day later, goalkeeper Chris Kirkland re-signed with Sheffield Wednesday on a one-year contract. Also later on the same day, the Owls signed last seasons loanee Sam Hutchinson on a free transfer from Chelsea. Hutchinson signs on a two-year contract, with rumours that Wednesday battled off Millwall and West Bromwich Albion for Hutchinson's signature. On 10 July, fan favourite José Semedo resigned a one-year contract at Sheffield Wednesday. Three days later, Glenn Loovens signed a new one-year contract at Sheffield Wednesday, Stuart Gray later announced that he would be the captain of Sheffield Wednesday for the upcoming season. At the end of July, Sheffield Wednesday completed a deal for Leeds United defender Tom Lees for an undisclosed fee. 3-days before the first game of the new season and it was confirmed that trialist Dejan Kelhar had signed for the club on a short contract for a free transfer. Later on though and bad news for fans of Sheffield Wednesday as they lost one of their best players - Michail Antonio. He signed for Nottingham Forest for a fee of £1.5 million. Antonio scored some vital goals in Wednesday's 2011-12 Football League One promotion, and was the Owls' top scorer the next season.

Wednesday's first-team took part in their first pre-season friendly 10-days into July, as the Owls travelled to face York City. An own-goal and a fantastic long-distance strike from Chris Maguire both in the first-half saw the Owls win the game 2–0. Just over a week later and Sheffield Wednesday played their second pre-season friendly away to Bury. The Owls struck just three-minutes into the game with a goal by Jacques Maghoma. However, Bury equalised 5-minutes before half-time to make it all level at the break. Atdhe Nuhiu headed a goal in the second-half, while Giles Coke rounded off a 3–1 victory to Sheffield Wednesday. A day after this game and Wednesday flew out to Slovenia for a week, in the middle of which they played a game against Russian side FC Arsenal Tula. The Owls took an early lead just three-minutes in with Michail Antonio being on target, however 5-minutes later and Arsenal Tula equalised. The game was fairly even throughout, but with 5-minutes to go of the full 90-minutes and Arsenal Tula scored to win the game 2–1. Sunday 27 July and the Owls faced local rivals Doncaster Rovers in a friendly match. Goals either half from Atdhe Nuhiu and Michail Antonio gave Sheffield Wednesday a two-nil lead, but two-goals in 15-minutes by Doncaster meant the match finished level at 2–2. Sheffield Wednesday's only home pre-season game came the following Wednesday as the team faced Premier League side Newcastle United. Although the Owls had the majority of possession, had a few chances (including hitting the bar), it was a second-half strike by Newcastle that was the difference as the Owls lost 0–1. Sheffield Wednesday kicked off their last pre-season friendly away to local rivals Barnsley at 1pm on Saturday 2 August. A tight game finished 1–1, with the Owls equalising in the second-half thanks to Kieran Lee.

August
Hours before Sheffield Wednesday undertook their first competitive game of the season away to Brighton & Hove Albion a signing was confirmed. 21-year-old striker Stevie May signed on a 4-year contract from St Johnstone. May has a great goalscoring record, seeing him score 67-goals in 118 career appearances. Soon after and the first game of the season kicked off and an even game where the Owls had the majority of the possession in the first-half saw its opening goal when Giles Coke curled the ball fantastically into the top corner of the net. 5-minutes into the second half and Brighton went down to ten-men after a high-footed challenge saw a player gain a straight red card. Although, Wednesday looked to push on from this point, Brighton had a great period which saw débutant Keiren Westwood make a fantastic save and the other débutant Tom Lees clear off the line. The last 15-minutes and Wednesday managed to hold out for a fantastic victory away from home. It took 3-months last season for the Owls to win their first game of the season, this time round it took one-day. Later on in the week and Wednesday played their first home game of the season in the midweek League Cup game against Notts County. Just two-minutes into the game and Jacques Maghoma cut inside onto his right foot and scored the first goal of the game. 10-minutes and a couple of chances later and the Owls were 2–0 up thanks to Gary Madine comfortably tapping in a cross at the back post. It was Madine's first goal since coming back from his time in prison last season. Atdhe Nuhiu had 5 key chances, mainly headers, before he did finally score in the second-half. Nuhiu and Madine did come close again before full-time, but the Owls strolled through into the second round winning 3–0. The Owls' third game within the first week of the new season was at home to last seasons play-off finalists Derby County. Wednesday started the brighter of the two teams in a contest that involved chances for both sides. In the first-half Jacques Maghoma linked up with Nuhiu before firing just wide, Chris Maguire hit the underside of the bar from a free-kick, Sam Hutchinson had a header cleared off the line and débutant Stevie May had a shot go just wide. Derby came out playing better in the second half and had two one-on-one's, but keeper Keiren Westwood made saves on both occasions. An entertaining game finished goalless, with Sheffield Wednesday keeping three clean sheets in the first three games of the season.

Another mid-week game came at home to Millwall, a team who had got off to a great start to the beginning of the new season and also had yet to concede a goal. The first chance fell to Millwall when they had a free-kick go just wide of the target. Compared to the previous game against Derby this game seemed a much less entertaining game, with the next best chance falling to Atdhe Nuhiu whose header went over the bar. Into the second half and a free-kick for handball was awarded to the Owls and Chris Maguire stepped up and fired the ball into the back of the net with the help of a deflection on the way. Millwall stepped up their game from this point, but only created half chances as they failed to break Wednesday's defence down. However, with just over 5-minutes to go and a Millwall player and Keiren Westwood seemed to just clash/bump into each other in the area. Although, the referee saw this as a foul and gave a penalty. But, justice was served as Millwall failed to equalise from the spot and instead hit the post. Into the dying seconds of five-minutes added time and Millwall managed to find space for a shot and scored with virtually the last kick of the game, with the match ending 1–1. A few days later and Sheffield Wednesday faced one of the few trips up North to play Middlesbrough. 6-minutes in and Nuhiu finished home on the line after a corner saw the ball continue to bounce in the box, but Nuhiu did not give up until the ball was in the back of the net. New signing Stevie May nearly doubled the Owls' lead as a great finger tip save saw his shot hit the post. Atdhe Nuhiu was soon involved again as his flick on saw Stevie May score his first goal for the club with a delightful finish into the far corner. 2–0 up at half-time and things could not have been going better for Wednesday, that is until it did in the second-half. A free-kick saw Nuhiu head home his second goal of the game. Just under 20-minutes to go though and captain Glenn Loovens fouled a man in the box and Middlesbrough scored the resultant penalty kick. Sheffield Wednesday hit the woodwork again, and then Middlesbrough were awarded another penalty. A powerful shot in the box hit Loovens on the arm, something he probably could not do anything about, but Middlesbrough did not care as they scored again. Into the dying seconds and Middlesbrough nearly equalised as cross could not quite reach the feet of one of their players. 3-points though it was for Sheffield Wednesday, with the result looking kind on Middlesbrough's behalf.

The next game for Sheffield Wednesday was in the second round of the League Cup against Premier League opposition Burnley away at Turf Moor. Atdhe Nuhiu scored the winning goal from a penalty after Jérémy Hélan was brought down and secured a place in the 3rd round against the defending Premier League and League Cup champions Manchester City. One day before the match against Nottingham Forest, Sheffield Wednesday signed Hallam Hope on loan until 2 January from Everton. The opponents Nottingham Forest was currently first-place having picked up 10 points in their first four games. In the 37th minute, former Sheffield Wednesday player Michail Antonio wriggled into space and lifted the ball into the box, where Henri Lansbury had ghosted in unattended to nudge a free header past Keiren Westwood to give the away team the lead into the first-half. Sheffield Wednesday dominated the second-half, the closest chance came from Atdhe Nuhiu in the 90th minute forcing an impressive save from Karl Darlow. It finished 0–1 to Nottingham Forest and it was Wednesday's first defeat in the season. Immediately after the game, Sheffield Wednesday signed free-agent Claude Dielna on a three-year contract.

September
On deadline day, Sheffield Wednesday signed ex Real Madrid player, Royston Drenthe from Reading on loan until 2 January. On 4 September, Sheffield Wednesday chairman Milan Mandarić announced that takeover talks between him and Hafiz Mammadov has broken down due to his difficulties in Azerbaijan. He quoted, "Our supporters were extremely excited when the takeover was announced, like me they believed that Mr. Mammadov offered a great opportunity for the club, in hindsight my desire to please our supporters probably clouded my decision to grant further time for him to complete the process." The next game was between Bolton Wanderers and it was a very dominating display from Sheffield Wednesday. In the first-half, Stevie May smashed the ball in the back of the net. However, it was harshly disallowed due to the referee claiming that Atdhe Nuhiu had fouled the defender in the build-up to Stevie May's shot and denying his second goal of the season. The visitors then went close again when Chris Maguire had Andy Lonergan beaten all ends up with a crisp finish but Matt Mills cleared the ball off the line. Those were the best chances of the game as they ended up having a total of 24 shots and failed to capitalize on getting a goal, which ended in a disappointing 0–0 draw. Birmingham City was next up in their second straight away game. The first half was a stalemate, but in the second-half Sheffield Wednesday were looking much more likely after the interval and gave Birmingham City cause for concern with a flurry of dangerous attacks. And they got their reward for their hard efforts as Stevie May scored the goal to give the Owls the lead just after the hour mark. At the very late stage of the game, substitute Jérémy Hélan scored the second goal after Chris Maguire picked up possession in the area and teed up the pace who thumped home from 12 yards to seal their third away win in four games.

The next game at Hillsborough was against Reading in front of a packed crowd. During the first-half, Sheffield Wednesday conceded a penalty after Giles Coke brought down Glenn Murray. Fortunately though, Keiren Westwood made a terrific stop from Murray's penalty and finished 0–0 in the first-half. Reading had a series of more chances in the second, but Sheffield Wednesday made them pay for their missed opportunities, as Stevie May put in a deflected free-kick to give the mighty owls their first victory at Hillsborough since March. Later in the week, it was the 3rd-round League Cup game against Premier League giants Manchester City. In the first-half, Sheffield Wednesday held their own and managed to keep it 0–0 in 45 minutes. But in the second-half, Manchester City scored straight away with Frank Lampard tucked in James Milner's cross soon after the restart before Edin Džeko swept in a pass from Jesús Navas, who added a ferocious drive. Yaya Touré converted a penalty after Lampard was tripped by Kamil Zayatte. He was sent off as Džeko's header, José Ángel Pozo got his début goal and another Lampard strike sank the Owls' 10 men and the final score was 7-0.

Back in the Championship, Sheffield Wednesday faced Cardiff City away in looking to continue their 2-game league winning streak. They made a bright start as Stevie May rounded the goalkeeper David Marshall inside six minutes but having his shot cleared off the line by Fábio. Then Cardiff took the lead at 39th minute, Sean Morrison with a thumping header past Keiren Westwood. Sheffield Wednesday tied it early in the second-half, Chris Maguire fizzed in a low cross from the right, prompting Morrison to slide in and inadvertently prod the ball beyond Marshall for an own-goal. The hosts regained the lead through Anthony Pilkington, who juggled the ball deftly and volleyed in from 12 yards. It finished 2–1 to Cardiff City and ended Sheffield Wednesday's unbeaten away league run. Next game was against in-form Ipswich Town who were on a 4-game winning streak into the game at Hillsborough. The hosts took an early lead through Atdhe Nuhiu's near-post header from the following corner from Jacques Maghoma. Wednesday had goals disallowed for infringements either side of half time. Kamil Zayatte nodded home after a brilliant reflex save by Dean Gerken, only for referee Darren Bond to blow for a foul. After the break Nuhiu saw his finish ruled out for offside, before Williams made it all square in the 62nd minute. He took the ball down on his chest at the edge of the box before hitting a low shot beyond Keiren Westwood and in off the far post and the game finished at 1–1.

October
The first game of October saw the Owls take trip down to local rivals Leeds United. The home team were first to carve a clear cut chance as Tommaso Bianchi fed for Mowatt but Keiren Westwood was sharp off as line to narrow the angle and make the stop. Souleymane Doukara then placed his slide rule finish just wide of the target and Rodolph Austin brought another smart save from Westwood as Leeds looked the more likely to score. In the second half, Jacques Maghoma led the charge and whipped in a dangerous centre for Maguire to bury first time into the bottom the corner. With ten minutes left on the clock Leeds found a leveller. The ball fell kindly to Bellusci in the area from a free kick and the defender dispatched his strike neatly into the corner and the game finished 1–1. After the international break, Sheffield Wednesday returned to league duty at home against Watford under new boss Slaviša Jokanović. It was a bad day for the Owls as Sam Hutchinson was stretchered off after making his return to the first team since his back injury in the third league game of the season. Then Matěj Vydra broke the offside trap, albeit in the most tight of circumstances, and advanced to play in Odion Ighalo, who slotted into an empty net. Moments after Keiren Westwood received treatment for a knock on the knee, Watford seized the advantage and doubled their lead. The game was all over on the 69th minute as Vydra scored Watford's third goal of the game and it finished a heavy 3–0 defeat on home soil.

The next game faced a long trip to London against Brentford on Tuesday night. The main chances of the night saw Kieran Lee rebound hit the underside of the bar after Jérémy Hélan's shot was blocked. Jonathan Douglas had his attempt to put the home side in the lead headed clear from the line by Liam Palmer before Jota drilled over the bar, the match ended in a 0–0 draw. Gary Taylor-Fletcher signed a one-month loan deal from Leicester City. Sheffield Wednesday played against Norwich City at Hillsborough. And they started on the front foot, dominating the early exchanges against a Norwich side looking to reignite their early season spark. Stevie May headed just wide following a swift three-man move but Norwich countered a few minutes later and Westwood saved superbly from Lewis Grabban. And the impetus certainly stayed with Wednesday. Gary Taylor-Fletcher had a half chance on 67 minutes after a fine pass from Claude Dielna before Liam Palmer smashed into the side-netting having taken a clever back heel from Stevie May into his stride. But on 69 minutes, the away team came closest to breaking the deadlock. Gary O'Neil's free kick found Cameron Jerome in space and his header seemed goalbound only for Keiren Westwood to delve into the top drawer and prevent the opening goal. The Republic of Ireland international promptly repeated the feat moments later to deny substitute Nathan Redmond, whose blistering low drive was diverted past the post. And if that were not enough, Westwood again kept the Owls in the game with 13 minutes to go, this time thwarting Jerome from close range. It would have been harsh for Wednesday to lose the game and they duly held out to record another clean sheet – their second in a week and ninth of the season.

November

On 1 November, Sheffield Wednesday was away at Charlton Athletic. The visitors took a deserved first-half lead when loanee Royston Drenthe found the net with a crisp long-range effort. The forward had fired a left-footed short narrowly wide of the post before opening the scoring with a quality run and shot, Wednesday's first goal in four matches. Five minutes after coming on, Igor Vetokele tapped in Rhoys Wiggins' cross to draw the relieved hosts level in the 70th minute, the game ended in a stalemate. Few days later, Sheffield Wednesday was up against Bournemouth at home. It was certainly a very even game until latest goalscorer Royston Drenthe was sent off for a 2nd bookable offence. Which resulted in the away side scoring five minutes later through a counter-attack from Andrew Surman. Bournemouth sealed victory on the 69th minute from a goal by Ryan Fraser. Next up was local rivals Rotherham United at Hillsborough. Sheffield Wednesday had the first chance of the game but Gary Taylor-Fletcher flicked Hélan's cross just past the post. The hosts nearly broke their home duck in bizarre circumstances when Atdhe Nuhiu pressurised Kirk Broadfoot into over-hitting his backpass to Adam Collin who saw his sliced clearance go just wide. Then a controversial moment happened when Sheffield Wednesday believed that they should have had a penalty, which was denied by the ref Nigel Miller and finished 0–0.

During the international break, Sheffield Wednesday striker Stevie May got his first-ever international cap for Scotland in their 3–1 defeat against England. Couple days before the game against Huddersfield Town, Sheffield Wednesday brought in their fourth loan signing this season, this time bringing in Lewis McGugan from Watford and made his first start in that match. The home side best chances fell to Nahki Wells, who twice had efforts blocked by Keiren Westwood. Stevie May unbelievably had his shot come off the post and crossbar to deny his fourth goal of this campaign. Another penalty was denied in the late stages of the match when Chris Maguire was tackled by Joel Lynch, but the referee declared that The Owls forward was diving and booked him for it and the game ended in another 0–0 draw. Next game was back at Hillsborough against Wigan Athletic. The away side scored the first goal from a corner-kick on the 26th minute from Chris McCann. Then immediately from kick-off, Sheffield Wednesday equalized when Atdhe Nuhiu and he teed up unmarked strike partner May for a simple close-range finish past Latics goalkeeper Scott Carson. May scored his second of the game and turned the contest in the Owls' favour in the 71st minute. He met Maguire's cross from the left and his header hit both posts before being adjudged to have crossed the line. 2–1 was the final result and turned Sheffield Wednesday's eleven game winless into a four-game unbeaten run.

December
Looking for win for the second game in a row in their first match of December, Sheffield Wednesday took on Blackburn Rovers at Ewood Park. Kieran Lee gave the visitors the lead on three minutes after pouncing on a mistake from Steele who failed to hold on to Stevie May's initial shot. Blackburn equalised when Rhodes nodded down into the path of Baptiste who wrapped his foot over the ball to fire past Westwood from 10 yards. Wednesday missed a glorious chance to retake the lead after 36 minutes when Glenn Loovens headed over a Royston Drenthe free-kick from five yards. Westwood kept the scores level in the second half when he saved a thunderous volley from Tunnicliffe and tipped over the crossbar. David Dunn then flashed a shot wide for Rovers before substitute Claude Dielna sealed the win for the visitors late-on. His 25-yard shot took a deflection as it flew past goalkeeper Jason Steele and secured a dramatic win for Stuart Gray's side. Next game was at Hillsborough against Wolves. The home side went close early on when Stevie May rounded Wolves goalkeeper Carl Ikeme, only for Richard Stearman to clear his shot off the line. Loovens then rose to meet Chris Maguire's corner but headed inches wide and Royston Drenthe went just as close with a sweet volley. The game looked set to end goalless when Leon Clarke, who played for Wednesday between 2007 and 2010, buried the winner. Then The Owls faced a trip to London at Craven Cottage against Fulham. Tom Lees failed to get a good connection at the far post when free, before Marcus Bettinelli made a good save to keep out Chris Maguire's drive and Kostas Stafylidis cleared off the line from Stevie May. Fulham broke the deadlock in the 34th minute when McCormack fired in a superb free-kick after Glenn Loovens had conceded the foul. Hutchinson doubled the advantage when he nodded in from Bryan Ruiz's free-kick for his first goal for the club. The third came midway through the second half as Christensen converted from Hugo Rodallega's pass, before Woodrow added a fourth from the spot after Patrick Roberts had been fouled by Claude Dielna.

On Boxing Day, Sheffield Wednesday faced bottom Blackpool. On the 39th minute, Sheffield Wednesday received a penalty after Peter Clarke fouled Stevie May and Chris Maguire stepped up and scored his third goal of the season. They had their chances with Chris Eagles shooting wide and Nathan Delfouneso having a curling effort saved after Wednesday's opener. The Owls went close to doubling their advantage when Maguire's low cross from the left deflected onto the crossbar, before Miller was booked for turning Tony McMahon's centre into the Wednesday goal with a hand. Home goalkeeper Keiren Westwood brilliantly kept out Ishmael Miller's three-yard header, before Miller received a second caution for a late tackle on Tom Lees. Then Sheffield Wednesday faced Wigan Athletic in their final game of 2014. Lewis McGugan was a constant threat for Stuart Gray's side and struck from range to test Scott Carson, while at the other end, McClean pounced on Ben Watson's delivery to score after the break, only for the linesman's flag to cut short his celebration. Wednesday, the lowest scorers in the division before kick-off, shaded proceedings and though a stalemate looked likely, they took advantage of Callum McManaman's recklessness after doing a two-footed challenge on Claude Dielna. Nuhiu saw a header saved by Carson quickly after the dismissal but beat the Wigan keeper a minute later when he powered home Jérémy Hélan's cross to secure Wednesday's fourth win in six matches.

January
First game of the new year was the FA Cup Third Round match-up against familiar opponents and current Premier League champions Manchester City. It was a brilliant first-half performance from the away side, scoring the opening goal after 14 minutes when Atdhe Nuhiu fired home at the end of a flowing move down the right that also involved Stevie May and Kieran Lee. But in the second-half,  the hosts equalised almost immediately after sending on their two playmakers Silva and Nasri, with the pair linking up on the left of the Owls' box and playing in Milner to convert his second goal of the season. Manuel Pellegrini's men took control from that point and Milner shot wide, while Silva had an effort well saved as the Premier League side desperately looked to avoid a replay. They got their wish a minute into stoppage time when Jesús Navas played the ball across the box and Milner nipped in front of his marker to tap into an empty net. The scoreline finished 2–1 to Man City. Sheffield Wednesday returned next week in an away league fixture against Nottingham Forest. In the first-half, chances were rare at both ends, Wednesday made the most of their first real threat right at the end of the half. Kane denied Nuhiu's effort, only for Lee to throw himself at the rebound and squeeze in the opener. Nottingham Forest keeper Dorus de Vries, making his first league start of the season ahead of Karl Darlow, could do little five minutes after the break as Maguire nipped into the box after latching onto a poor Jack Hobbs clearance and smashed home his fourth goal of the season. Sheffield Wednesday would keep the clean sheet for the fourteenth time this season as they won 2–0.

After that Sheffield Wednesday returned for a home fixture for the first time in 2015 against Bolton Wanderers. The away team took an early lead when Liam Feeney put the ball in the net in the second minute of the game. Then they doubled that lead when Darren Pratley scored in the 25th minute. Looking to reply immediately, Sheffield Wednesday was awarded a penalty three minutes later and Chris Maguire placed it perfectly in the right side of the net to make it 2–1. Wednesday head coach Stuart Gray brought on Sam Hutchinson as part of a double substitution in the 69th minute as the home side pushed forward, but he was shown a second yellow card after just 14 minutes on the field for a late challenge. Stevie May then thought he had equalised when he bundled the ball over the line after Atdhe Nuhiu's effort hit the bar, but he was controversially ruled offside by the assistant referee. That cost the match for Sheffield Wednesday and continued their poor home form in the Championship. Next match was against Birmingham City at Hillsborough. Winger Jacques Maghoma had a low shot saved by goalkeeper Darren Randolph in a poor quality first half. Then Clayton Donaldson, who had scored five times in his previous three games, narrowly failed to connect with a centre from left-back Jonathan Grounds just before the break before keeper Keiren Westwood was forced to turn over a powerful drive from winger David Cotterill.
Things did not improve after the break as home striker Atdhe Nuhiu was off target with a couple of efforts and Cotterill shot wide for Birmingham and the match finished a stalemate. Two days later, Sheffield Wednesday was legitimately taken over this time from a Thai consortium led by businessman Dejphon Chansiri whose family owns Thai Union Group, acquired 100% stakes in the Championship. Milan Mandarić announced that he will step down as Chairman and as a director but will stay in an advisory role for Dejphon Chansiri. The first match under new ownership was against Reading. Both sides started at a frenetic pace and Simon Cox had the first chance of the game for Reading as he tried to bend the ball round Keiren Westwood's right hand, but the keeper made a decent save. Garath McCleary then dragged the ball wide from 10 yards after Nathaniel Chalobah fizzed the ball into the penalty area. But it was Pavel Pogrebnyak who made the breakthrough on the half-hour mark with a powerful header beyond the clutches of Westwood following a cross from Kelly. Nathaniel Chalobah, on loan from Chelsea, then despatched Garath McCleary's cross for his first Reading goal. The Owls were unlucky not to pull one back before half-time as Adam Federici flung himself low to his right to tip Baker's shot around the post. Reading were awarded a penalty after the break when substitute Jérémy Hélan crashed into the back of Pavel Pogrebnyak, but Robson-Kanu side-footed it straight into Westwood's hands. The game finished a 2–0 defeat for Sheffield Wednesday.

February
Deadline Day was one of the more exciting ones in a while for Sheffield Wednesday as there was multiple speculations on who Wednesday would sign as the takeover suggested that for once Sheffield Wednesday have the cash to splash. The first announcement of the day was Dejan Kelhar had re-signed his contract until the end of the season. The defender has been unlucky so far this season as his original 6-month contract deal was hindered with the fact he had been injured due to tearing his anterior cruciate ligament. Next announcement of the day was that Sheffield Wednesday have signed Sergiu Buș from CSKA Sofia for a rumoured £350,000 on a three and a half year contract. He has scored ten goals so far this season in nineteen appearances for CSKA Sofia. The next signing of the day was Marnick Vermijl who played for Manchester United, he only made one appearance for them this season in the Capital One Cup and he went on a season-long loan last season to NEC where he made twenty-eight appearances and scored three goals for them. The next signing was the return of Lewis McGugan on loan from Watford for the rest of the season. He made seven appearances in his first spell towards the end of 2014. There was one last signing on Deadline Day, in came Filipe Melo from Moreirense for an undisclosed fee.

Players

First team

Out on loan

|other=on loan at Carlisle United}}

Development squad

Out on loan

Academy

Squad information

Transfers

In

Out

Loans in

Loans out

Contracts

Debuts
Players making their first team Sheffield Wednesday début in a competitive match.

International call-ups

Fixtures and results

Pre-season

Football League Championship

Last updated: 2 May 2015  Source:

League Cup

FA Cup

Squad statistics

Appearances and goals

 

|-
|colspan="14"|Players for Sheffield Wednesday who are currently out on loan:

|-
|colspan="14"|Sheffield Wednesday players from this season that are no longer at the club:

|}

Top goal scorers

Disciplinary record

Competitions

Overall

Championship

Classification

Results summary

Results by round

Awards

Sheffield Wednesday Player of the Month

Sky Bet Football League Team of the Week

References

2014-15
2014–15 Football League Championship by team